The Rosen Publishing Group is an American publisher for educational books for readers from ages pre-Kindergarten through grade 12.  It was founded in 1950 under the name "Richards Rosen Press" and is located in New York City. The company changed its name in 1982.

Britannica Educational Publishing had 700+ titles in print for the school market in 2017 which it published in association with Rosen Educational Services, adding 100 new titles each year.

Rosen Publishing and owner Roger Rosen have acquired the following publishers:
Roger Rosen became a co-owner of Gareth Stevens after the company was acquired from Reader's Digest in 2009.
Roger Rosen acquired Marshall Cavendish’s North American library operation, renamed Cavendish Square, in 2013.
Roger Rosen acquired Enslow Publishing in 2014.
Rosen Publishing acquired Jackdaw Publications in 2015.
Rosen Publishing acquired the rights to Greenhaven Press, Lucent Books, and KidHaven Press from Gale in 2016. Their imprints are all aimed at upper elementary and middle school readers and focus on the development of learning and thinking skills and social studies.

Rosen Teen Health & Wellness 
Rosen Teen Health & Wellness is an interactive database of material for teens on gender identity, FGC, stalking, human trafficking and other issues that can affect teens. Established in 2007, it has received wide praise from American Libraries, Booklist, School Library Journal, Voice of Youth Advocates and many others.

References

External links
 Rosen Publishing – About Us

Educational publishing companies of the United States
Book publishing companies based in New York (state)
Educational book publishing companies
Publishing companies established in 1950
1950 establishments in New York City